Bằng Lũng is a township (Thị trấn) and capital town of Chợ Đồn District, Bắc Kạn Province, in Vietnam.
the town located:
 Ngoc Phai commune, Phuong Vien commune to the north 
 Phuong Vien commune, Dai Sao commune to the East
 Dai Sao commune, Bang Lang commune to the South
 Bang Lang commune, Yen Thuong commune, Ngoc Phai commune to the West
Passing through Bằng Lũng township, there are provincial road number 257 to the capital of Bắc Kạn, provincial 254. This town is at the upper part of Cầu River. According to the statistics of the population and household survey in 2009, Bằng Lũng has a population of 5,999, of which 2,976 are male and 3,023 are female
Bằng Lũng township consist of these group: Ban Duong 1 and 2, Na Pai, Ban Tan, group 1, group 2A, 2B, 3, 4, 5, 6A, 6B,7, 8, 9, 10, 11A, 11B, 12, 13, 14A, 14B, 15, 16, 17.

Populated places in Bắc Kạn province
Communes of Bắc Kạn province
District capitals in Vietnam
Townships in Vietnam